Meden may refer to:

People 
Andreas von der Meden (1943–2017), German actor, voice actor and musician
Carl August von der Meden (1841–1911), first president of the Deutscher Tennis Bund
Nelly Meden (1928–2004), Argentine film, stage and television actress
Karl-Friedrich von der Meden (1896–1961), general in the Wehrmacht of Nazi Germany

Places 
Meden Buk,  is a village in the municipality of Ivaylovgrad, in Haskovo Province, southern Bulgaria
Meden Rudnik, is the youngest and the biggest neighbourhood of Burgas, which is the biggest city in South Eastern Bulgaria
Meden School, is a mixed secondary school and sixth form on Burns Lane between Market Warsop and Church Warsop in Nottinghamshire, England
Meden Vale, is a small former coal mining village, originally known as Welbeck Colliery Village, in north Nottinghamshire, England
Henchir-El-Meden,  is a locality and archaeological site in Tunisia
River Meden, is a river in Nottinghamshire, England